Music by Prudence is a 2010 short documentary film directed by Roger Ross Williams. It tells the story of the then 24-year-old Zimbabwean singer-songwriter Prudence Mabhena, and follows her transcendence from a world of hatred and superstition into one of music, love, and possibilities.

Music by Prudence won the 2009 Academy Award for Best Documentary (Short Subject) at the 82nd Academy Awards. The film premiered on HBO on 12 May 2010.

Synopsis
Music by Prudence tells a self-empowering story of one young woman's struggle who, together with her band, overcomes seemingly insurmountable odds and, in her own voice, conveys to the world that "disability does not mean inability."

Zimbabwean singer-songwriter Prudence Mabhena was born severely disabled. The society she was born into considers disabilities to carry the taint of witchcraft. Because of this, many disabled children are abandoned. But Prudence and the seven young members of the band she has formed called Liyana, all disabled, have managed to overcome stereotypes and inspire the same people that once saw them as a curse.

The main subjects of Music by Prudence, and members of the band "Liyana", are:
Prudence Mabhena – singer and composer (suffers from arthrogryposis)
Tapiwa Nyengera – back-up singer, keyboard, front man (has spina bifida)
Energy Maburutse – first marimba player, back-up vocalist (suffers from osteogenesis imperfecta, brittle bone syndrome)
Honest Mupatse – tenor marimba player (has hemophilia)
Marvelous Mbulo – back-up singer (has muscular dystrophy)
Vusani Vuma – bass marimba player (is hearing-impaired)
Goodwell Nzou – traditional drums and percussion, back-up singer (leg amputated)
Farai Mabhande – lead keyboardist (suffers from arthrogryposis)

Awards
On 7 March 2010, Music by Prudence won the 2009 Academy Award for Best Documentary (Short Subject).<ref>Short Film Winners: 2010 Oscars

Music by Prudence also won:
 the Audience Award for Best Documentary Short at the Florida Film Festival
 Best Short at the Africa World Documentary Film Festival
 Best Short at the DocuWest Film Festival.

See also
iThemba, another documentary film about Liyana

References

External links
 
 Official website
 Official Liyana Website
 King George VI Centre and School for Children with Physical Disabilities
 Excerpt

2010 films
Best Documentary Short Subject Academy Award winners
American short documentary films
Films shot in Zimbabwe
Documentary films about people with disability
Documentary films about poverty
2010 short documentary films
Zimbabwean music
Documentary films about singers
Documentary films about women in music
2010s English-language films
2010s American films